William Cullen (31 May 1887 – 7 May 1945) was a New Zealand-born Australian cricketer. He played one first-class match for New South Wales in 1914/15.

See also
 List of New South Wales representative cricketers

References

External links
 

1887 births
1945 deaths
Australian cricketers
New South Wales cricketers
Cricketers from Wellington City